Randal F. Dickey (July 5, 1899 – October 16, 1975) was a United States politician.

Dickey was born in Trenton, Kansas. During World War I, he served in the United States Navy. He subsequently served in the California legislature; from 1947 to 1951, he was Republican Floor Leader of the California State Assembly.

References

1899 births
1975 deaths
People from Saline County, Kansas
United States Navy personnel of World War I
Republican Party members of the California State Assembly
20th-century American politicians